Vedat Yenerer (born 2 January 1965) is a Turkish journalist and writer. As a war correspondent he has visited over 75 countries, and he has published a number of non-fiction books. Since 2008 he has been a defendant in the Ergenekon trials.

Career
Yenerer worked at Cumhuriyet for five years (1987 - 1992), before moving into television. He was at Show TV (1992-1993 and 1996-1997), Star TV (1993-1994), and 32. Gün (1995 -1996). From 1999 to 2002 he was at Kanal D, and then at Habertürk TV (2002 - 2003). At Show TV he won an award in 1997 for "Human Drama in Hakkari", and he has won various other journalism awards. He has reported from many conflict zones, including Iraq, Palestine, Lebanon, Kosovo, Azerbaijan, Albania, Afghanistan, Chechnya, Eritrea, Georgia, Sudan, Somalia, and Kashmir.

He taught a course in international journalism at Istanbul University (2005 - 2006), and was a columnist at Yeniçağ from 2004 to 2008. In this period he also presented a news show on Karadeniz TV (2006 - 2007).

Sweden-based Nordic Monitor news website identified him as a neo-nationalist figure who promotes racist and anti-immigrant views as the chief advisor to Turkey’s nationalist, right-wing opposition İYİ (Good) Party leader Meral Akşener. The Monitor also published court-authorized wiretap transcripts dated January 22, 2008 that revealed how Yenerer was collecting sex tapes to allegedly blackmail others.

Books
 Ateş Ortasında,  Ümit Yayincilik, 2001
 Yalanistan Güneydoğu'dan Gerçek Gazeteci Öyküleri , Ümit Yayincilik, 2001
 Düşman Kardeşler, Bulut Yayinlari, 2004
 Çeçenler Kimsesiz Bir Millet , Birharf Yayinlari, 2005
 Irak Yanıyor, 2007
 Kanlı Kukla PKK: Terör Örgütü Gerçeği , Pegasus Yayinlari, 2008
 Demokrasiye ve Hukuka Ergenekon Tezgahı , Bilgi Yayinevi, 2010
 Gördüm Onlar Yaşıyor , Kripto Basin Yayin, 2013

See also
List of arrested journalists in Turkey

References 

1965 births
Journalists from Istanbul
Living people
Imprisoned journalists